Copiah–Lincoln Community College (Co–Lin) is a public community college with its main campus in Wesson, Mississippi. The Co–Lin District serves a seven-county area including Adams, Copiah, Franklin, Jefferson, Lawrence, Lincoln and Simpson counties. The college provides academic college-level courses for the first two years of four-year degree programs as well as career and technical programs.

History
Copiah–Lincoln Agricultural High School, through the joint efforts of Copiah and Lincoln Counties, was established in the fall of 1915 in Wesson, Mississippi, at the edge of Copiah County. Copiah–Lincoln Junior College was organized during the summer of 1928. Since its establishment in 1928, Copiah–Lincoln has continued to grow in size and prestige and now occupies a prominent position in the state's educational system with an enrollment of over 3,200 and a physical plant valued at more than $35 million. Five counties have joined in the support of Copiah–Lincoln: Simpson County in 1934; Franklin County in 1948; Lawrence County in 1965; Jefferson County in 1967; and Adams County in 1971.

In the fall of 1972, upon the request of local and state officials, Copiah–Lincoln opened a branch at Natchez, Mississippi, to better meet the educational needs of the citizens of that area. In the fall of 1997 the Simpson County Center opened in downtown Magee. Academic Evening Classes, Employment Training and an LPN class were offered in that facility until the fall of 2005, when a new  facility was opened at Legion Lake, between Magee and Mendenhall. The new facility, named in honor of the late Sidney Parker, opened in the fall of 2005 with a comprehensive academic program, along with three Career-Technical programs. Copiah–Lincoln Junior College became Copiah–Lincoln Community College on July 1, 1988, as approved by the state and the Board of Trustees. The name change reflects Co–Lin's continuing service to the community, its young people, adults, and senior citizens.

Accreditation
Copiah–Lincoln Community College is accredited by the Commission on Colleges of the Southern Association of Colleges and Schools to award Associate in Arts and Associate in Applied Science degrees. Copiah–Lincoln is also an active member of the American Association of Community Colleges, the Mississippi Association of Community and Junior Colleges, the Mississippi Association of Colleges, and the Southern Association of Community and Junior Colleges.

Campuses
 Natchez Campus, Natchez, Mississippi
 Simpson County Center, Mendenhall, Mississippi
 Wesson Campus, Wesson, Mississippi

Athletics
Co–Lin sponsors six men's sports (baseball, basketball, football, golf, tennis, and archery), and five women's sports (basketball, softball, tennis, soccer and archery). It also sponsors a cheerleading squad which is one of the most competitive squads in the state, winning numerous awards at junior college coed division at the University of Alabama UCA cheer camp. The athletic teams are nicknamed the Wolf Pack.

The teams compete in NJCAA Region 23, which includes colleges in Mississippi and Louisiana. The baseball, golf and softball teams participate in Division II. All other sports, except football, play in Division I. Bryan Nobile is the college's athletic director.

The women's tennis team was the NJCAA Number 1 Academic Team of the Year in 2019. Co–Lin has produced over 100 NJCAA Academic All-Americans since 2000. The football team won the Mississippi Association of Community and Junior Colleges in State Championship in 2012. The Lady Wolves basketball team, coached by Gwyn Young, the NJCAA's second winningest active coach, has made numerous trips to the NJCAA National Tournament. The baseball team has finished fourth in both the 2000 and 2005 NJCAA World Series.

Notable alumni
Greg Briggs, former NFL player
Tony Bryant, former NFL player
Jim Carmody, football coach for Southern Mississippi Golden Eagles
Nick Fairley, former NFL player
Mary Lou Godbold (1912–2008), Mississippi state senator
Victor Green, former NFL player
Cindy Hyde-Smith, United States Senator 
Nook Logan, baseball player for the Washington Nationals
DeQuan Menzie, former NFL player
Cleveland Pinkney, former NFL player
Montez Sweat, NFL player
Randy Thomas, former NFL player
M. K. Turk, basketball coach for Southern Mississippi Golden Eagles
Reggie Williams, Basketball player for the Golden State Warriors

References

External links
Official website

Community colleges in Mississippi
Educational institutions established in 1928
Universities and colleges accredited by the Southern Association of Colleges and Schools
Education in Copiah County, Mississippi
Education in Adams County, Mississippi
Education in Simpson County, Mississippi
Universities and colleges in the Jackson metropolitan area, Mississippi
NJCAA athletics
1928 establishments in Mississippi